Cupressaceae is a conifer family, the cypress family, with worldwide distribution. The family includes 27–30 genera (17 monotypic), which include the junipers and redwoods, with about 130–140 species in total. The bark of mature trees is commonly orange- to red- brown and of stringy texture, often flaking or peeling in vertical strips, but smooth, scaly or hard and square-cracked in some species.

Description

The leaves are arranged either spirally, in decussate pairs (opposite pairs, each pair at 90° to the previous pair) or in decussate whorls of three or four, depending on the genus. On young plants, the leaves are needle-like, becoming small and scale-like on mature plants of many genera; some genera and species retain needle-like leaves throughout their lives. Old leaves are mostly not shed individually, but in small sprays of foliage (cladoptosis); exceptions are leaves on the shoots that develop into branches. These leaves eventually fall off individually when the bark starts to flake. Most are evergreen with the leaves persisting 2–10 years, but three genera (Glyptostrobus, Metasequoia and Taxodium) are deciduous or include deciduous species.

The seed cones are either woody, leathery, or (in Juniperus) berry-like and fleshy, with one to several ovules per scale. The bract scale and ovuliferous scale are fused together except at the apex, where the bract scale is often visible as a short spine (often called an umbo) on the ovuliferous scale. As with the foliage, the cone scales are arranged spirally, decussate (opposite) or whorled, depending on the genus. The seeds are mostly small and somewhat flattened, with two narrow wings, one down each side of the seed; rarely (e.g. Actinostrobus) triangular in section with three wings; in some genera (e.g. Glyptostrobus and Libocedrus), one of the wings is significantly larger than the other, and in some others (e.g. Juniperus, Microbiota, Platycladus, and Taxodium) the seed is larger and wingless. The seedlings usually have two cotyledons, but in some species up to six. The pollen cones are more uniform in structure across the family, 1–20 mm long, with the scales again arranged spirally, decussate (opposite) or whorled, depending on the genus; they may be borne singly at the apex of a shoot (most genera), in the leaf axils (Cryptomeria), in dense clusters (Cunninghamia and Juniperus drupacea), or on discrete long pendulous panicle-like shoots (Metasequoia and Taxodium).

Cupressaceae is a widely distributed conifer family, with a near-global range in all continents except for Antarctica, stretching from 70°N in arctic Norway (Juniperus communis) to 55°S in southernmost Chile (Pilgerodendron uviferum), further south than any other conifer species. Juniperus indica reaches 4930 m altitude in Tibet. Most habitats on land are occupied, with the exceptions of polar tundra and tropical lowland rainforest (though several species are important components of temperate rainforests and tropical highland cloud forests); they are also rare in deserts, with only a few species able to tolerate severe drought, notably Cupressus dupreziana in the central Sahara. Despite the wide overall distribution, many genera and species show very restricted relictual distributions, and many are endangered species.

The world's largest (Sequoiadendron giganteum) and tallest (Sequoia sempervirens) trees belong to the Cupressaceae, as do six of the ten longest-lived tree species.

Classification

Molecular and morphological studies have expanded Cupressaceae to include the genera of Taxodiaceae, previously treated as a distinct family, but now shown not to differ from the Cupressaceae in any consistent characteristics.  The member genera have been placed into five distinct subfamilies of Cupressaceae, Athrotaxidoideae, Cunninghamioideae, Sequoioideae, Taiwanioideae, and Taxodioideae.  The former Taxodiaceae genus, Sciadopitys, has been moved to a separate monotypic family Sciadopityaceae due to being genetically distinct from the rest of the Cupressaceae. In some classifications Cupressaceae is raised to an order, Cupressales. Molecular evidence supports Cupressaceae being the sister group to the yews (family Taxaceae), from which it diverged during the early-mid Triassic. The clade comprising both is sister to Sciadopityaceae, which diverged from them during the early-mid Permian. The oldest definitive record of Cupressaceae is Austrohamia minuta from the Early Jurassic (Pliensbachian) of Patagonia, known from many parts of the plant. The reproductive structures of Austrohamia have strong similarities to those of the primitive living cypress genera Taiwania and Cunninghamia. By the Middle to Late Jurassic Cupressaceae were abundant in warm temperate–tropical regions of the Northern Hemisphere. The diversity of the group continued to increase during the Cretaceous period. However, their current diversity is lower than their Late Mesozoic-early Cenozoic apex.

The family is divided into seven subfamilies, based on genetic and morphological analysis as follows:

 Subfamily Cunninghamioideae 
 Cunninghamia 
 Subfamily Taiwanioideae 
 Taiwania 
 Subfamily Athrotaxidoideae 
 Athrotaxis  – Tasmanian cedar
 Subfamily Sequoioideae 
 Metasequoia  – dawn redwood
 Sequoia  – coast redwood
 Sequoiadendron  – giant sequoia
 Subfamily Taxodioideae 
 Cryptomeria  – sugi
 Glyptostrobus  – Chinese swamp cypress
 Taxodium  – bald cypress
 Subfamily Callitroideae 
 Actinostrobus  – cypress-pine
 Austrocedrus 
 Callitris  – cypress-pine
 Diselma 
 Fitzroya  – alerce
 Libocedrus 
 Neocallitropsis 
 Papuacedrus 
 Pilgerodendron 
 Widdringtonia 
 Subfamily Cupressoideae 
  Callitropsis  – Nootka cypress
 Calocedrus  – incense-cedar
 Chamaecyparis  – cypress
 Cupressus  – cypress
 Fokienia  – Fujian cypress
 Hesperocyparis 
 Juniperus  – juniper
 Microbiota 
 Platycladus  – Chinese arborvitae
 Tetraclinis 
 Thuja  – thuja or arborvitae
 Thujopsis  – hiba
 Xanthocyparis  – cypress

A 2010 study of Actinostrobus and Callitris places the three species of Actinostrobus within an expanded Callitris based on analysis of 42 morphological and anatomical characters.<ref name=" Piggin and Bruhl (2010)">{{cite journal | last1 = Piggin | first1 = J. | last2 = Bruhl | first2 = J.J. | year = 2010 | title = Phylogeny reconstruction of Callitris Vent. (Cupressaceae) and its allies leads to inclusion of Actinostrobus within Callitris | journal = Australian Systematic Botany | volume = 23 | issue = 2| pages = 69–93 | doi=10.1071/sb09044}}</ref>

Phylogeny based on 2000 study of morphological and molecular data.  Several further papers have suggested the segregation Cupressus species into four total genera.

A 2021 molecular study supported a very similar phylogeny but with some slight differences, along with the splitting of Cupressus (found to be paraphyletic):

Uses

Many of the species are important timber sources, especially in the genera Calocedrus, Chamaecyparis, Cryptomeria, Cunninghamia, Cupressus, Sequoia, Taxodium, and Thuja.  Calocedrus decurrens is the main wood used to make wooden pencils, and is also used chests, paneling, and flooring. In China, cypress wood known as baimu or bomu, was carved into furniture, using notably Cupressus funebris, and particularly in tropical areas, Fujian cypress and the aromatic wood of Glyptostrobus pensilis. Juniperus virginiana has used by Native Americans for waymarking. Its heartwood is fragrant and used in clothes chests, drawers and closets to repel moths. It is a source of juniper oil used in perfumes and medicines. The wood is also used as long lasting fenceposts and for bows.

Several genera are important in horticulture. Junipers are planted as evergreen trees, shrubs, and groundcovers. Hundreds of cultivars have been developed, including plants with blue, grey, or yellow foliage. Chamaecyparis and Thuja also provide hundreds of dwarf cultivars as well as trees, including Lawson's cypress. Dawn redwood is widely planted as an ornamental tree because of its excellent horticultural qualities, rapid growth and status as a living fossil. Giant sequoia is a popular ornamental tree and is occasionally grown for timber. Giant sequoia, Leyland cypress, and Arizona cypress are grown to a small extent as Christmas trees.

Some species have significant cultural importance. The ahuehuete (Taxodium mucronatum) is the national tree of Mexico. Coast redwood and giant sequoia were jointly designated the state tree of California, and are major tourist attractions where they grow naturally. Parks such as Redwood National and State Parks and Giant Sequoia National Monument protect almost half the remaining stands of Coast Redwoods and Giant sequoias. Bald cypress is the state tree of Louisiana. Bald cypress, often festooned with Spanish moss, of southern swamps are another tourist attraction. They can be seen at Big Cypress National Preserve in Florida. Bald cypress "knees" are often sold as souvenirs, made into lamps, or carved to make folk art. Monterey cypresses are often visited by tourists and photographers, particularly an old tree known as the Lone Cypress.

The fleshy cones of Juniperus communis are used to flavour gin.

Native Americans and early European explorers used Thuja leaves as a cure for scurvy. Distillation of Fokienia roots produces an essential oil called pemou oil used in medicine and cosmetics.

Recent progress on Endophyte Biology in Cupressaceae, by the groups of Jalal Soltani (Bu-Ali Sina University) and Elizabeth Arnold (Arizona University) have revealed prevalent symbioses of endophytes and endofungal bacteria with family Cupressaceae. Furthermore, current and potential uses of Cupressaceous tree's endophytes in agroforestry and medicine is shown by both groups.

Chemistry
The Cupressaceae trees contain a wide range of extractives, especially terpenes and terpenoids, which both have strong and often pleasant odors.

The heartwood, bark and leaves are the tree parts richest in terpenes. Some of these compounds are widely distributed in other trees as well, and some are typical for Cupressaceae family. The most known terpenoids found in conifers are sesquiterpenoids, diterpenes and tropolones. Diterpens are commonly found in different types of conifers and are not typical for this family. Some sesquiterpenoids (e.g. bisabolanes, cubenanes, guaianes, ylanganes, himachalanes, longifolanes, longibornanes, longipinanes, cedranes, thujopsanes) also present in Pinaceae, Podocarpaceae and Taxodiaceae. Meanwhile, chamigranes, cuparanes, widdranes and acoranes are more distinctive for Cupressaceae. Tropolone derivatives, such as nootkatin, chanootin and hinokitiol are particularly characteristic for Cupressaceae.

Disease vectors
Several genera are an alternate host of Gymnosporangium rust, which damages apples and other related trees in the subfamily Maloideae.

Allergenicity
The pollen of many genera of Cupressaceae is allergenic, causing major hay fever problems in areas where they are abundant, most notably by Cryptomeria japonica (sugi) pollen in Japan.  Highly allergenic species of cypress with an OPALS allergy scale rating of 8 out of 10 or higher include: Taxodium, Cupressus, Callitris, Chamaecyparis, and the males and monoicous variants of Austrocedrus and Widdringtonia. However, the females of some species have a very low potential for causing allergies (an OPALS allergy scale rating of 2 or lower) including Austrocedrus females and Widdringtonia females.

References

Further reading
 Soltani, J. (2017) Endophytism in Cupressoideae (Coniferae): A Model in Endophyte Biology and Biotechnology. In: Maheshwari D. (eds) Endophytes: Biology and Biotechnology. pp. 127–143. Sustainable Development and Biodiversity, vol 15. Springer, Cham.
 Pakvaz, S, Soltani J. (2016) Endohyphal bacteria from fungal endophytes of the Mediterranean cypress (Cupressus sempervirens) exhibit in vitro bioactivity. Forest Pathology, 46: 569–581.
 Soltani, J., Zaheri Shoja, M., Hamzei, J., Hosseyni-Moghaddam, M.S., Pakvaz, S. (2016) Diversity and bioactivity of endophytic bacterial community of Cupressaceae. Forest Pathology, 46: 353–361.
 Farjon, A. (1998). World Checklist and Bibliography of Conifers. Royal Botanic Gardens, Kew. 300 p. .
 
 Little, D. P., Schwarzbach, A. E., Adams, R. P. & Hsieh, Chang-Fu. (2004). The circumscription and phylogenetic relationships of Callitropsis and the newly described genus Xanthocyparis (Cupressaceae). American Journal of Botany'' 91 (11): 1872–1881. Available online .

External links
 Arboretum de Villardebelle Cone images of many species
 Gymnosperm Database: Cupressaceae
 Flora of China - Cupressaceae
 Flora of North America - Cupressaceae
 ×Taxodiomeria peizhongii tree named 'Dongfangshan’ US PP17767 P3

 
 

 
Cupressales
Pinales families